Nebmaatre (“The Lord of the Truth is Re”) was an ancient Egyptian prince and High Priest of Re in Heliopolis during the 20th Dynasty. He is likely to have been a son of Ramesses IX since they are mentioned together on a door lintel in a Heliopolis temple. He was a brother to Prince Montuherkhepeshef; another possible brother is Pharaoh Ramesses X.

Sources
 Aidan Dodson & Dyan Hilton: The Complete Royal Families of Ancient Egypt. Thames & Hudson, 2004, pp. 191,193

Ancient Egyptian princes
High Priests of Re
People of the Twentieth Dynasty of Egypt
Ramesses IX
12th-century BC clergy